The São Tomé and Príncipe Red Cross  was founded in 1976. It has its headquarters in São Tomé.

External links
Society Profile

Red Cross and Red Crescent national societies
1976 establishments in São Tomé and Príncipe
Organizations established in 1976
Medical and health organisations based in São Tomé and Príncipe
São Tomé